Robert Gall (27 May 1918, in Saint-Fargeau, Yonne – 16 May 1990) was a French lyricist. He married Cécile Berthier, daughter of Paul Berthier, co-founder of Petits Chanteurs à la Croix de Bois. Robert and Cécile are parents of singer France Gall. Their two sons, twins Patrice and Philippe, were born in 1946 and also work in the field of music. Robert Gall is buried in the Cemetery of Montmartre.

Gall began his career as a lyric singer, then turned to the variety song before finally specializing in writing lyrics. Gall wrote for Charles Aznavour ("La Mamma"), for Édith Piaf in the early 1960s, and for his daughter France in the mid- to late 1960s.

1918 births
1990 deaths
People from Yonne
French lyricists
Burials at Montmartre Cemetery